Ventspils State Gymnasium No.1 is a secondary school located in Ventspils, Latvia.

History
Ventspils Gymnasium No.1 was founded in December 9, 1918, thus being the first secondary school founded in independent Latvia.  Over the years its name has been changed many times mostly because of the regime change in the country, for example, when Latvia was a part of the USSR it was named after Janis Fabricius, a military commander of the Red Army. In 1996 it received status of Gymnasium, meaning that it provides advanced secondary education.

Renovation
 Since 2004 the school's building has been experiencing a lot of improvements. The Government of Latvia and Ventspils City Council invested more than one million euro to build a new sports hall, proving a new place for students to do sports. Subsequently, communication technology and natural science equipment was installed to accommodate the needs of increasing numbers of young graduates deciding to study IT and natural sciences in universities. For example, among graduates in 2012 almost 40% decided to pursue studies in one of these subjects.

Notable people

Head Teachers 
 Teodors Grīnbergs (1918 - 1932)
 Atis Jaunzemis (1932 - 1939)
 Jānis Gulbis (1939 - 1941)
 Herberts Vikmanis (during the occupation of Nazi Germany)
 Jānis Miza (1945 - 1949)
 Elfrīda  Grīnberga (1949 - 1950)
 Rita Ceikele (1951 - 1962)
 Alberts Pukjans (1962 - 1967)
 Jāzeps Marnauza (1967 - 1969)
 Voldemārs Kalniņš (1969 - 1975)
 Inese Vītola (1975 - 1988)
 Maruta Koha (1989 - 1994)
 Pārsla Kopmane (1994 -)

Alumni
Ģirts Valdis Kristovskis (b. 1962), politician
Ēriks Rags (b. 1975), javelin thrower
Ansis Brūns (b. 1976), javelin thrower
Gatis Gūts (b. 1976), former Latvian bobsleigh pilot
Janis Geste (b. 1983), journalist
Lauma Grīva (b. 1984), athlete
Jānis Strēlnieks (b. 1989), basketball player

References

Schools in Latvia
Ventspils
1918 establishments in Latvia
Educational institutions established in 1918